García Rodrígues da Fonseca (born 10th-century) was a Galician nobleman, Lord of Honra de Fonseca.

He was the grandson of Garcia Moniz, o Gasco. His wife was Dordia Ramírez.

García Rodrígues was appointed Lord of Couto de Leomil by Henry, Count of Portugal in 1102.

References 

10th-century Portuguese people
11th-century Portuguese people
Medieval Portuguese nobility
Portuguese Roman Catholics